Ludwik Schneider (13 August 1899 – 1972) was a Polish footballer. He played in two matches for the Poland national football team from 1923 to 1926.

References

External links
 

1899 births
1972 deaths
Polish footballers
Poland international footballers
Place of birth missing
Association footballers not categorized by position